The 2020 Coupe de France Final was a football match between Paris Saint-Germain and Saint-Étienne to decide the winner of the 2019–20 Coupe de France, the 103rd season of the Coupe de France. The final was originally scheduled for 25 April, but was postponed to 24 July due to concerns over the COVID-19 pandemic in France.

On 28 April 2020, Prime Minister Édouard Philippe announced all sporting events in France, including those behind closed doors, would be banned until September. The FFF were considering whether the final of the Coupe de France could be rescheduled for when events are allowed to restart. On 26 June, the FFF announced that the final was rescheduled to 24 July.

Paris Saint-Germain won the final 1–0 for their 13th Coupe de France title.

Background
Paris Saint-Germain were the runners-up of last year's edition, having lost the 2019 final to Rennes after a penalty shoot-out following a 2–2 draw in extra time.

Saint-Étienne reached the final this year, having lost at the round of 32 of last year's edition to Dijon. This was the first time they reached the final since 1982, a game they lost to Paris Saint-Germain as well.

Route to the final

''Note: H = home fixture, A = away fixture

Match

Summary
The only goal of the game came in the 14th minute; Kylian Mbappé cut in from the right, with his shot being saved by Saint-Étienne goalkeeper Jessy Moulin, before the rebound fell to Neymar, who shot high to the net off the underside of the crossbar from six yards out.

Details

Notes

References

Coupe De France Final 2020
Coupe De France Final 2020
2020
Coupe De France Final 2020
Coupe De France Final
Coupe De France Final
Final
Coupe De France Final